Lieutenant Colonel Robert Smith may refer to:

Robert E. Smith (1918-2004), American pilot